Wannabe: How the Spice Girls Reinvented Pop Fame is a biography of the Spice Girls written by David Sinclair. It was published in 2004 by Omnibus Press.

References

External links
 Omnibus Press website
 

British biographies
2004 non-fiction books
Books about pop music
Works about the Spice Girls